John Edward Rand (19 June 1902 – 1970) was an English footballer.

He played for Cockfield, Everton, Watford, Flint Town, Connah's Quay & Shotton, Darlington, briefly at Tunbridge Wells Rangers then to Scarborough and West Stanley.

Notes

1902 births
1970 deaths
English footballers
Association football inside forwards
Cockfield F.C. players
Everton F.C. players
Watford F.C. players
Flint Town United F.C. players
Connah's Quay & Shotton F.C. players
Darlington F.C. players
Tunbridge Wells F.C. players
Scarborough F.C. players
West Stanley F.C. players
English Football League players
People from Cockfield, County Durham
Footballers from County Durham